Bakers is a neighborhood in Nashville, Davidson County, Tennessee, in the United States.

History
Bakers was historically known as Bakers Station and Baker. A post office was established as Bakers Station in 1875, renamed Baker in 1882, and remained in operation until it was discontinued in 1922. The community was named for a member of the Baker family, the original owner of the town site.

References

Populated places in Davidson County, Tennessee
Neighborhoods in Nashville, Tennessee